Xinyang (postal: Sinyang) is a prefecture-level city in southeastern Henan province, People's Republic of China, the southernmost administrative division in the province. Its total population was 6,234,401 according to the 2020 census. As of the 2010 census, 1,230,042 of them lived in the built-up (or metro) area made of two urban districts, Pingqiao and Shihe.

Geography

Geography of city
The city is located in the southernmost part of Henan Province on the south bank of the Huai River and in the middle of the Dabie Mountains area. It borders the cities Zhumadian to the north and Nanyang to the northwest, and the provinces of Anhui and Hubei to the east and south respectively. The region where Xinyang is located is considered a subtropical area and the Dabie mountainous terrain is mainly to the north, south, and east of the city.

Climate

Xinyang has a monsoon-influenced, four-season humid subtropical climate (Köppen Cfa/Cwa), with cold, damp winters, and hot, humid summers. The months of April through June here are slightly cooler than much of the rest of the province. The annual precipitation is just above , and close to two-thirds of it occurs from May to September. With monthly percent possible sunshine ranging from 38% in March to 47% in four months, the city receives 1,974 hours of bright sunshine annually; January through March are the cloudiest months.

Administration
The Xinyang City is divided into two districts and eight counties.

Demographics 
According to the 2010 Census, the population of Xinyang is of 6,109,106 inhabitants, 6.39% less than the population marked on the last census of 2000, when there were 6,527,368 inhabitants in the city.

Culture 

Xinyang Tea Culture Festival is held during April, 28th and 30th every year. The 25,000-capacity Xinyang Stadium, which has a capacity of 25,000, is located in the city. It is used mostly for association football and sometimes for athletics.

The Jingju Temple in Guangshan county was the source of the first Chinese section of Buddism "Tiantai school" as early as the fifth year of Tianbao in the Northern Qi Dynasty (554 A.D.), since the saint monk Huisi came to the Jingju Temple. Emperor Shenzong of Song bestowed the "Emperor entitled Brahma Temple" still conserved in the temple.

Transportation 

Highway system
China National Highway 312
China National Highway 107
G4 Beijing–Hong Kong and Macau Expressway
G40 Shanghai–Xi'an Expressway
G45 Daqing–Guangzhou Expressway
Railway system
Jingguang Railway
Jingjiu Railway
Ningxi Railway
Beijing–Guangzhou–Shenzhen–Hong Kong High-Speed Railway
Airport
Xinyang Minggang Airport

Education 
 Higher Education
 Xinyang Normal College
 Xinyang Agricultural College
 Secondary Education
 Xinyang Senior High School

Recreation 
 Jigong Mountain
 Nanwan Lake
 Lingshan Temple

Twin towns 
 Niimi, Okayama, Japan
 Ashkelon, Israel

See also
List of twin towns and sister cities in China

References

External links
 – official Xinyang government e-portal

 
Cities in Henan
Prefecture-level divisions of Henan